Cyryx College is a private college in Malé City, Maldives. Cyryx College has been in operation since 1993. Cyryx College is the longest serving private college in the Maldives, with the most Maldives Qualification Authority (MQA) certified courses in the education sector.

History 
Cyryx College began on 24 August 1993. Starting with 4 computers and 6 students, Cyryx currently caters to over 1,500 students and employs over 65 academic and support staff members. Cyryx College offers certificates, diplomas, and degrees in Information Technology, Management, and Multimedia.

Facilities 

Cyryx College operates 3 campuses: the Maafannu campus houses the School of Information Technology, the Machangolhi campus houses the School of Business, and the Galolhu campus houses the School of Multimedia Arts and Design.

Schools and campuses

School of Business

The School of Business is located at Machangoalhi campus on Kenery Magu. It offers the following programmes:

School of Information Technology

The School of Information Technology is located at Maafannu campus (M. Kothanmaage, Maaveyo Magu).  It offers the following programmes:

School of Multimedia Arts & Design
The School of Multimedia Arts & Design is located at the Galolhu Campus on Bodurasgefaanu Magu. It offers the following programmes:

School of Humanities & Education
The School of Humanities and Education (SHE) offers the following programmes:

Affiliations 

Cyryx College is affiliated with international partners such as Help University of Malaysia, whose bachelor's programmes in business and IT can be completed at Cyryx College. Other affiliated universities include SRM University, Sri Lanka; KDU, KBU, APIIT, Taylors, Limkokwing, and Binary College from Malaysia; RMIT University from Australia; and both Coventry and Plymouth University from the United Kingdom.

Awards and achievements
Cyryx College has been given the following awards:

National Public Service Award (2002)
Education Leadership Award (2013)
World Quality Commitment Award (2013), a vanity award

See also
Education in the Maldives

References

External links

Education in the Maldives
Educational organisations based in the Maldives
Schools in the Maldives
Educational institutions established in 1993
Universities in the Maldives
1993 establishments in the Maldives